Haywards is a brand of pickles sold in the United Kingdom. "Liven Up Your Food" is their slogan. The brand is owned by Mizkan of Japan, and the pickles are produced in Mills Hill, Manchester and Bury St Edmunds.

History 
The brand dates from 1868.

Varieties 
Haywards Mixed Pickles (cauliflower, gherkins, onions, red pepper)
Haywards Piccalilli
Haywards Traditional Gherkins in Vinegar
Haywards Pickled Beetroot
Haywards Strong Pickled Onions
Haywards Pickled Red Cabbage
Haywards Silverskin Onions
Haywards Sweet Onions

See also

 List of brand name condiments

Pickles
British condiments
Brand name condiments
Haywards